Paul Deng Jizhou (November 9, 1905 – August 10, 1990) was a Chinese Catholic priest and Bishop of the Roman Catholic Diocese of Jiading between 1949 and 1990.

Biography
Deng was born on November 9, 1905. He was ordained a priest on February 9, 1936, and appointed Bishop of the Roman Catholic Diocese of Jiading on June 9, 1949. The bishop's ceremony followed on September 21, 1949, with Archbishop of Chongqing  as Chief Consulator, shortly before the Communists state was established on October 1 of that same year. He was one of the six Chinese bishops appointed by the Holy See in the same year. The other five are Matthias Duan Yinming, Ignatius Pi Shushi, Ignatius Kung Pin-Mei and Melchior Zhang Kexing. He died on August 10, 1990.

References

1905 births
1990 deaths
Sichuanese Roman Catholics
20th-century Roman Catholic bishops in China